Do Choqa (also Romanized as Do Choqā, Dow Cheqā, and Do Cheqā; also known as Do Chīān, Dow Chīān, Qal‘a Dūchīa, and Qal‘eh Dūchīa) is a village in Miyan Darband Rural District, in the Central District of Kermanshah County, Kermanshah Province, Iran. At the 2006 census, its population was 243, in 69 families.

References 

Populated places in Kermanshah County